San Marino competed at the 2019 World Aquatics Championships in Gwangju, South Korea from 12 to 28 July.

Artistic swimming

San Marino entered two artistic swimmers.

Women

Swimming

San Marino entered two swimmers.

Men

Women

References

Nations at the 2019 World Aquatics Championships
San Marino at the World Aquatics Championships
2019 in San Marino